Richford is a census-designated place comprising the main settlement in the town of Richford, Franklin County, Vermont, United States. Its population was 1,361 as of the 2010 census, out of 2,308 people in the entire town of Richford.

The Richford CDP is located in the northwest part of the town of Richford, along the Missisquoi River. Vermont Route 105 passes through the community, staying on the south side of the river; it leads east  over the Green Mountains to North Troy and southwest down the Missisquoi River valley  to Enosburg Falls. Vermont Route 139 (Main Street) intersects VT 105 in the south part of town, crosses the Missisquoi, becomes Province Street, and leads north  to the Canada–United States border. Quebec Route 139 continues north from the border  to Sutton, Quebec.

References

Census-designated places in Vermont
Census-designated places in Franklin County, Vermont